HMCS Buctouche was a  that served in the Royal Canadian Navy (RCN) during the Second World War. She served primarily in the Battle of the Atlantic as a convoy escort. She was named for Bouctouche, New Brunswick.

Background

Flower-class corvettes like Buctouche serving with the Royal Canadian Navy during the Second World War were different from earlier and more traditional sail-driven corvettes.  The "corvette" designation was created by the French as a class of small warships; the Royal Navy borrowed the term for a period but discontinued its use in 1877. During the hurried preparations for war in the late 1930s, Winston Churchill reactivated the corvette class, needing a name for smaller ships used in an escort capacity, in this case based on a whaling ship design. The generic name "flower" was used to designate the class of these ships, which – in the Royal Navy – were named after flowering plants.

Corvettes commissioned by the Royal Canadian Navy during the Second World War were named after communities for the most part, to better represent the people who took part in building them. This idea was put forth by Admiral Percy W. Nelles. Sponsors were commonly associated with the community for which the ship was named. Royal Navy corvettes were designed as open sea escorts, while Canadian corvettes were developed for coastal auxiliary roles, which was exemplified by their minesweeping gear. Eventually the Canadian corvettes would be modified to allow them to perform better on the open seas.

Construction
Originally named Bathurst, but due to conflict with a Royal Navy vessel her named was changed to Buctouche. She was ordered on 22 January 1940 from Davie Shipbuilding & Repairing Co. Ltd., Lauzon, Quebec as part of the 1939–1940 Flower-class building program. She was laid down on 14 August 1940 and was launched on 20 November that year. Buctouche was commissioned into the RCN on 5 June 1941. In October 1943, Buctouche was sent for a four-month refit where her forecastle was extended at Saint John Dry Dock & Shipbuilding Ltd. on 29 January 1944.

Service history
After working up, Buctouche joined the Newfoundland Escort Force in July 1941. She escorted convoys from St. John's to Iceland from August 1941 to January 1942.

In June 1942 Buctouche transferred to the Western Local Escort Force (WLEF). This posting was permanent until the end of the war, with the exception of two months in the summer of 1944 where she was assigned to Quebec Force. On 7 July 1942, Buctouche under Skr. In June 1943 she was assigned to WLEF escort group W-1.

Following the war, Buctouche was paid off on 23 October 1945. She was sold for scrap and broken up in 1949 at Hamilton.

Trivia

While under the command of Skr. Lt. G.N. Downey, RCNR, Buctouche appeared in a feature-length Hollywood war movie titled CORVETTE K225, starring Randolph Scott as the commanding officer. She was only filmed from her starboard side, which carried the K225 pennant number for the movie. Her port side carried her actual number K179 as she was still an active-duty warship.

The ship's badge depicted Adolf Hitler being tossed off a bucking bronco, a play being made both on the name "Buctouche" and the rolling pitching motion which Flower-class corvettes were renowned for.

References

External links
 HMCS Buctouche on the Arnold Hague database at convoyweb.org.uk.

Flower-class corvettes of the Royal Canadian Navy
1940 ships